Marko Jevtović (born 5 January 1987 in Belgrade, SR Serbia, Yugoslavia) is a Serbian table tennis player. At the 2009 Summer Universiade, he won a bronze medal in the Men's doubles. He competed at the 2012 Summer Olympics in the Men's singles, but was defeated in the first round.

References

Serbian male table tennis players
1987 births
Living people
Olympic table tennis players of Serbia
Table tennis players at the 2012 Summer Olympics
Sportspeople from Belgrade
Universiade medalists in table tennis
Universiade bronze medalists for Serbia
Medalists at the 2009 Summer Universiade
Table tennis players at the 2020 Summer Olympics